Time to Rock 'n' Roll: The Anthology is a compilation album by Australian band Ol' 55, released in August 2016.

The album celebrates the 40th anniversary of their debut studio album, Take It Greasy. The 56-track anthology includes the entire Take It Greasy album,  plus stand alone singles, album cuts, demos, live recordings and rarities.

Track listing
CD1
 "Diana" (Paul Anka) - 2:53
 "Summertime Summertime (Intro)" (Tom Jameson, Sid Feller) - 1:39
 "The Iridescent Pink Sock Blues" (Glenn Cardier) - 2:25
 "I Wonder Why" (Melvin Anderson, Ricardo Weeks) - 2:16 
 "Almost Grown" (Chuck Berry) - 2:10
 "Think It Over (Buddy Holly, Jerry Allison, Norman Petty) - 2:01
 "Get a Job" (The Silhouettes) - 2:35
 "Doin' Fine" (Jimmy Manzie) - 2:38
 "Only Sixteen" Sam Cooke - 2:16
 "This Little Girl" (Gerry Goffin, Carole King) - 3:07
 "On the Prowl" (Manzie) - 2:58
 "New Girl in School" (Jan Berry, Roger Christian, Bob Norman, Brian Wilson) - 2:08
 "Skateboard Thrills" (Manzie) - 2:31
 "Looking for an Echo" (Richard Reicheg) - 3:22
 "Goodnight Sweetheart" (Calvin Carter, James "Pookie" Hudson) - 2:18
 "School Days (Outro)" (Berry) - 2:07
 "(I Want a) Rockin' Christmas" (Glenn A. Baker, Manzie) - 4:38
 "Little Saint Nick" (Wilson, Mike Love)  - 3:10
 "C'mon Let's Do It" (Baker, Manzie) - 2:35
 "A Teenager in Love"  (featuring Jan & Dean)  (Doc Pomus, Mort Shuman) - 2:45 
 "My Right of Way"  (by Frankie J. Holden)  (Baker, Manzie) - 2:53
 "Chartered Accountant Blues"  (by Frankie J. Holden)  (Holden) - 5:40
 "Shout Shout" (Ernie Maresca) - 2:32
 "Be My Little School Girl" (Paul Winley) - 1:48
 "High School Confidential" (Jerry Lee Lewis, Ron Hargrave) - 2:30
 "The Wilde Man" (Manzie) - 4:01
 "Roll Over Beethoven" (Berry) - 4:12
 "Pretty Little Angel Eyes" (Curtis Lee, Boyce and Hart) - 2:35

CD2
 "Do You Wanna Dance" (Bobby Freeman) - 2:32
 "Love of My Life" (Felice and Boudleaux Bryant) - 2:08
 "Caught in the Curl" (Manzie) - 2:18
 "Stay (While the Night Is Still Young)" (Manzie) - 4:06
 "(Feels Like a) Summer's Night" (Manzie) 3:52
 "He's Gotta Go" (Bruce Allen, Geoff Peterkin, Manzie, Rockville Jones, Patrick Drummond) - 2:30
 "Homework's Done" (Peterkin) - 1:42
 "Ruby" (Jerry Leiber, Mike Stoller) - 2:52
 "Living for Your Smile" (Manzie) - 3:19
 "Comic Book World" (Manzie) - 3:10
 "Time to Rock 'n' Roll" (Manzie) - 2:54
 "The Way to Fall In Love (Book II)" (Manzie) - 2:32
 "Peek-A-Boo!" (Jack Hammer) - 2:08
 "The Fool" (Lee Hazlewood, Naomi Ford) - 2:31
 "Two Faces Have I (Twyla Herbert, Lou Christie) - 2:57
 "Keep Your Hands Off My Baby" (Gerry Goffin, Carole King) - 3:35
 "Anywhere The Girl's Are" (P. F. Sloan, Steve Barri) - 2:57
 "Boom Boom Baby"  (Live)  (Dave Burgess) - 2:31
 "Let's Have a Party" (Live) (Jessie Mae Robinson) - 2:49
 "I Live for the Sun" (Live) (Richard Henn) - 2:52
 "Rag Doll" (Bob Crewe, Bob Gaudio) - 2:48
 "Breakaway" (Boudleaux & Felice Bryant) - 2:39
 "I'm Only Singing Rock 'n' Roll (for You)" (Ross Wilson) - 3:39
 "He's Our Golden Boy" (Manzie) - 2:12
 "Swingin' School" (Bernie Lowe, Dave Appell, Kal Mann) - 2:23
 "Be True to Your School (Love, Wilson) - 2:59
 "Surf's Down" (David Ackles) - 2:19
 "Looking For The Heart Of Saturday Night" (Tom Waits) - 3:11

Charts

Notes
 Tracks 1-1, 2–6, 2-7 and 1–17 to 1-20 non-album tracks
 Tracks 1–2 to 1-16 taken from the album Take It Greasy
 Tracks 1–21 to 1-22 solo tracks by Frankie J. Holden
 Tracks 1–23 to 1-28 and 2–1 to 2-3 taken from the album Fiveslivejive
 Tracks 2–4, 2-5 and 2–8 to 2-13 taken from the album Cruisin' for a Bruisin'
 Tracks 2–14 to 2-17 taken from the album The Vault
 Tracks 2–18 to 2-20 from the 1983 cassette [{Let's Have A Party - Live}]
 Tracks 2-21 taken from the album Open Top Cars & Girls in Tight T-Shirts
 Tracks 2–22 to 2-28 previously unreleased demo recordings

Release history

References

Ol' 55 (band) albums
Compilation albums by Australian artists
2016 compilation albums
Festival Records albums